SatanDisk is a SD and MMC card adapter for Atari 16-bit computers, such as the Atari ST invented 2007. The objective is to replace mechanical hard drives available from Atari (SH204, SH205 and Megafile) and compatible products. It is out of the pre-production stage and units have now been shipped to most customers. The interface allows the connection of an SD or MMC card to be attached to the ACSI (hard disc) port of Atari computers, and has been tested to be compatible with TOS versions 1.02 to 2.06. The maximum supported size is 4 GB. The device appears to the system as any regular ACSI attached hard disc, but has so far only been successfully used with the proprietary and commercial HDDriver driver package.

In 2009 the developer Jookie (Miroslav NOHAJ) introduced a successor UltraSatan which supports two SD/MMC cards in parallel. The adapter features hot-plug capability of the cards and includes a battery backed up RTC chip. Additionally to the commercial HDDriver it is supported by the free ICD PRO.

External links
 Project website SatanDisk
 Project website UltraSatan
 HDDRIVER website

Atari ST
Solid-state computer storage media